The Cutter is a 2005 American direct-to-video action film directed by William Tannen, and starring Chuck Norris, Joanna Pacuła, Daniel Bernhardt, Bernie Kopell and Marshall R. Teague. After a deadly kidnapping rescue gone wrong, a guilt ridden detective recruits his specialized SWAT team to successfully rescue an aged diamond cutter from the hands of a murderous thief.

Plot 

A former Spokane, Washington cop turned private investigator takes on a case of a missing diamond cutter that leads him on an adventure of love and villainy spanning from the Nazis to the present day Mob.

Cast 

 Chuck Norris as Detective John Sheperd
 Joanna Pacuła as Elizabeth Teller
 Daniel Bernhardt as Dirk Cross
 Bernie Kopell as Isaac Teller
 Todd Jensen as Parks
 Tracy Scoggins as Alena
 Marshall R. Teague as Moore
 Deron McBee as Alex, The Repairman
 Dean Cochran as Eddie
 Curt Lowens as Col. Speerman
 Aaron Norris as Tony Maylan
 Mark Ivanir as Dr. Joseph

Production

Filming
Shooting took place in Spokane, Washington.

Release

Home media
Sony released it to DVD in the US on March 14, 2006.

Reception

Critical response
Scott Weinberg of DVD Talk rated it 1.5/5 stars and called it "the epitome of all things cinematically generic".  David Johnson of DVD Talk wrote, "The Cutter is a mediocre film overall, and, specifically, a tame and lame action flick."

See also
 List of American films of 2006
 Chuck Norris filmography

References

External links 
 
 

2005 films
2005 direct-to-video films
2005 action thriller films
American action thriller films
Direct-to-video action films
Films scored by Elia Cmíral
Films shot in Washington (state)
American police detective films
Nu Image films
Sony Pictures direct-to-video films
Films directed by William Tannen (director)
2000s English-language films
2000s American films